Julio César Urías Acosta (born August 12, 1996), nicknamed "El Culichi", is a Mexican professional baseball pitcher for the Los Angeles Dodgers of Major League Baseball (MLB). The Dodgers signed him in 2012, and he made his MLB debut in 2016.

Early life
Urías is the son of Carlos Urías and Juana Isabel Acosta. He played with the Mexico national youth team in his early teens. At age 14, Urías met Los Angeles Dodgers scout Mike Brito, who had first scouted Fernando Valenzuela in the late 1970s. In June 2012, the Dodgers discovered 15-year-old Urías at a showcase in Oaxaca, on the same scouting trip in Mexico on which they signed Yasiel Puig. The Dodgers signed him on August 12, his 16th birthday. The Dodgers paid a signing fee of US$450,000, most of which went to the Diablos Rojos del México of the Mexican League.

Professional career

Minor leagues
Urías made his professional debut on May 25, 2013, for the Great Lakes Loons in the Midwest League as the youngest player in the league, striking out six batters over three shutout innings. He made a total of 18 starts and finished the season 2–0 with a 2.48 ERA, recording 67 strikeouts in 54.1 innings. He spent 2014 with the Rancho Cucamonga Quakes of the California League. In 25 appearances (20 of which were starts), he was 2–2 with a 2.36 ERA. He struck out 109 batters while walking only 37.

Urías was selected to play for the World team at the 2014 All-Star Futures Game and was selected as the Dodgers organizational "Minor League Pitcher of the Year" for 2014. He received an invitation to attend the team's 2015 major league spring training camp. After pitching in two games, for a total of two innings and a 4.50 ERA, he was the first to be cut from the roster and was reassigned to the team's minor league camp on March 14, 2015.

Urías was ranked by MLBpipeline.com as the top left-handed pitching prospect in all of baseball entering the 2015 season. MLB.com ranked him the 8th-best prospect in baseball, and Baseball America named him the #10 prospect in 2015. The Dodgers assigned him to the AA Tulsa Drillers of the Texas League to start the 2015 season. He was 3–4 with a 2.77 ERA in 13 starts for Tulsa.

Urias was promoted to the AAA Oklahoma City Dodgers on August 31, 2015. He struggled in his first AAA action, allowing nine runs in  innings over two starts. He also allowed six runs, including a grand slam homer, in just one inning in his one start in the Pacific Coast League playoffs. He was again invited to attend Dodgers spring training. He was assigned to AAA to begin the season, where he was 4–1 with a 1.10 ERA in seven starts. He also had a 27-inning scoreless streak during May for Oklahoma City.

Los Angeles Dodgers (2016–present)

2016: Rookie season
Urías was promoted to the Los Angeles Dodgers to make his major league debut against the New York Mets on May 27, 2016. At 19, he was the youngest starting pitcher to debut in the Majors since Félix Hernández in the 2005 season and the second youngest Dodgers starting pitcher to debut since 18-year-old Rex Barney in the 1943 season. (Joe Moeller at 19 years and 55 days is the youngest LA Dodger starting pitcher). Urias struggled in his debut, lasting only  innings while allowing five hits, three runs and four walks. He did strike out three, including the first batter he faced, Curtis Granderson. He was optioned back to AAA after the game. Three days later, he was returned to the active roster after starter Alex Wood went on the disabled list. Urías made his second start on June 2 against the Chicago Cubs. In 5 innings pitched, he gave up 6 runs (5 earned), including 3 home runs. He allowed 8 hits, and struck out 4. He picked up his first major league win, against the Milwaukee Brewers, on June 28, 2016, when he allowed two runs on two hits in six innings. He was the first teenage Dodger pitcher to throw 100 pitches in a game since Joe Moeller in 1962. He pitched in 18 games for the Dodgers, 15 of them starts, and was 5–2 with a 3.39 ERA, 84 strikeouts and 31 walks. He led the major leagues in pickoffs, with six.

Urías pitched two innings of relief in game five of the 2016 National League Division Series, picking up the win. At 20 years, 62 days old he became the youngest Dodgers pitcher to ever pitch in the postseason. He was two weeks younger than Don Drysdale was in game four of the 1956 World Series. He was also the fourth-youngest pitcher in MLB postseason history, behind Ken Brett (1967 World Series), Bert Blyleven (1970 ALCS), and Don Gullett (1970 NLCS and 1970 World Series). He became the youngest pitcher ever to start a postseason game when he started game four of the 2016 National League Championship Series. He allowed four runs in only  innings in the game.

2017
The Dodgers chose to keep Urías in extended spring training rather than having him on the opening day roster to start 2017, with the goal of limiting his innings so he would be able to pitch more later in the season. He rejoined the major league starting rotation on April 27. He made five starts for the Dodgers and was 0–2 with a 5.40 ERA. He was optioned back to the minors on May 21. In June while pitching for Triple-A Oklahoma City, Urías tore the anterior capsule in his left shoulder, which ended his 2017 season and required surgery.

2018
Urías spent most of the 2018 season recuperating from his injury and didn't begin rehabbing in the minors until July 30. He made three appearances for the Dodgers during the regular season, pitching four scoreless innings in September. Despite that, he was added to the Dodgers roster for the 2018 NLCS and 2018 World Series. He allowed one run in  innings against the Milwaukee Brewers in the NLCS and one run in three innings against the Boston Red Sox in the World Series.

2019: Suspension and return to rotation
Urías was scheduled to begin 2019 in the bullpen to reduce his innings in the early going, but injuries to Clayton Kershaw and Rich Hill led to him beginning the season in the rotation. He started four times, including a nine-strikeout game (in six innings) while allowing only one hit against the Brewers on April 18, after which he joined the bullpen. He picked up his first career save on May 6 against the Atlanta Braves.

Urías was placed on paid administrative leave on May 14 as a result of a domestic battery investigation, but was reinstated on May 21. On August 17, Urias was suspended for 20 games.

He wound up appearing in 37 games, with eight starts, and was 4–3 with a 2.49 ERA and 85 strikeouts. Balls hit against him had the lowest average exit velocity (83.2 mph) of those hit against all major league pitchers. Urías appeared in three of the five games of the NLDS against the Washington Nationals, allowing three runs to score in  innings and recording the loss in Game 4.

2020: World Series championship
Urías agreed with the Dodgers on a one-year, $1 million contract for 2020, avoiding arbitration. In the pandemic-shortened 2020 season, he became a full-time starter for the Dodgers and went 3–0 with a 3.27 ERA in 11 games. Urías picked up the win in the Dodgers' first playoff game of the season, the opener of the Wild Card Series against the Milwaukee Brewers, pitching three scoreless innings (with five strikeouts) in relief of Walker Buehler. In the NLDS against the San Diego Padres, he appeared in Game 3, working five innings, including one unearned run, to pick up the series-clinching win. In the NLCS against the Atlanta Braves he was the winning pitcher in the two games in which he appeared. Urías started Game 3 and allowed one run on three hits in five innings and then pitched the final three innings of the series-deciding Game 7, allowing no runners to reach base. Urías then started Game 4 of the 2020 World Series against the Tampa Bay Rays, pitching 4.2 innings and allowing two runs on four hits while striking out nine. In Game 6, Urìas entered in the 7th inning and pitched  scoreless innings to record the save and was on the mound when the Dodgers clinched their championship.

2021: MLB wins leader
Urías agreed with the Dodgers on a one-year, $3.6 million, contract for 2021, avoiding arbitration. 
Starting more than 20 games in a season for the first time in his career, Urías enjoyed his best season to date. He ended his 2021 campaign starting in 32 games, pitching  innings with 195 strikeouts, a 2.96 ERA, and a 20–3 record, the best in the league. He became the first pitcher in the National League since Max Scherzer in 2016 to collect 20 wins in a season, which was the most in the majors in 2021 and only the fourth 20-win season by a Mexican-born pitcher.

Urías started the second game of the 2021 NLDS against the San Francisco Giants, and allowed only one run on three hits in five innings with five strikeouts to pick up the win. He also pitched in the deciding fifth game of the series, entering in the third inning after the Dodgers decided to use two openers. He pitched four innings and allowed one run on three hits as the Dodgers won the series. He next appeared in a relief role in Game 2 of the 2021 NLCS against the Atlanta Braves, where he allowed two runs to score on three hits in only one inning, blowing the lead in a game the Dodgers lost. He then started, three days later, in Game 4 of the series, where he struggled, allowing five runs on eight hits in five innings to record the loss.

2022
Urías signed a one-year, $8 million contract with the Dodgers for 2022, in his second season of salary arbitration.

Continuing on his excellent form from the previous season, Urías kept his place on the Dodgers starting rotation. Despite owning a 3–4 record at the end of May after 10 starts, he compiled a solid 2.89 ERA, 42 strikeouts, and only 12 walks in that span. He went 3-1 in 5 June starts, achieveing a 2.20 ERA for the month, and lowering his overall ERA down to 2.64. He tossed a combined 12 innings in which he only allowed one earned run and two in total, in two victories against the Cleveland Guardians and the Atlanta Braves. Despite his solid numbers, Urías was not elected to the All-Star Game. Following the All-Star break, he went 4-0 in five starts in July, achieving a 2.71 ERA for the month.

To start August, he pitched a combined 18 innings in three wins against the Giants, Twins, and Brewers, in which he only allowed a single run: a Gilberto Celestino single that brought in Gio Urshela against Minnesota on August 9. He ultimately went 4–1 in the month, with a superb 0.90 ERA to go with 34 strikeouts in 30 innings pitched. 

For the season, Urías finished 17–7 with 166 strikeouts and led the National League in ERA with 2.16. 

In October 2022, it was announced that Urias intended to represent Mexico in the 2023 World Baseball Classic.

2023
Urías signed a one-year, $14.25 million contract with the Dodgers for 2023, in his final season of salary arbitration.

Pitching style
Urías' primary pitch is a fastball with a typical velocity between 90 and 95 miles per hour, peaking at 97. He also throws a low-80s changeup, curveball, and slider. His curveball initially had primarily horizontal movement, resembling a slurve. During the 2016 season, he altered his grip to add vertical movement. He began using the slider in 2015. Urías is also known for his pickoff move, leading the major leagues in his rookie season with six pickoffs.

Personal life
Urías underwent three surgeries on his left eye during his youth to remove a benign mass. As a result, his left eye is nearly closed, but he is able to see through it. When asked about his eye condition, Urías, a devout Roman Catholic, said, "That's how God works. He gave me a bad left eye but a good left arm." On May 19, 2015, he had elective surgery to correct the condition.

In May 2019, Urías was arrested for domestic battery. Los Angeles City Attorney Mike Feuer, deferred prosecution on the condition that Urías participate in a hearing, not commit acts of violence against anyone, and complete a 52-week domestic violence counseling program in person.

See also

 List of Major League Baseball players from Mexico
 List of World Series starting pitchers
 Los Angeles Dodgers award winners and league leaders

References

External links

1996 births
Living people
Arizona League Dodgers players
Baseball players from Sinaloa
Great Lakes Loons players
Los Angeles Dodgers players
Major League Baseball pitchers
Major League Baseball players from Mexico
Mexican expatriate baseball players in the United States
Mexican Roman Catholics
National League ERA champions
National League wins champions
Oklahoma City Dodgers players
Rancho Cucamonga Quakes players
Sportspeople from Culiacán
Tulsa Drillers players
2023 World Baseball Classic players